The Swamp Meat Intoxication is the debut EP by Circus of Pain, released in 1994 by Sub/Mission Records. The band comprises members of Meathead and Swamp Terrorists and involved the musical contributions of Pankow and Templebeat. On September 24, 1996 the album was reissued by Fifth Colvmn Records.

Reception

Aiding & Abetting preferred the originals to the remixes of The Swamp Meat Intoxication, saying "the remixes are nothing spectacular, really" and "just average German engineering-type stuff with a few bells and whistles. AllMusic awarded the album two and a half out of five stars and said "composed of members from Swamp Terrorists and Meathead, Circus of Pain play industrial-metal with S&M themes." Culture Shock Transmission described it as "a fresh, stylish, and damn funky release." Music From the Empty Quarter recommended the release to admirers of both bands. Sonic Boom called the release "something that any Swamp Terrorist junky would want to pick up for the sheer novelty value alone" and "while only an EP, and four of the eight songs merely being remixes of the same track, this release should not be taken lightly."

Track listing

Personnel
Adapted from the liner notes of The Swamp Meat Intoxication.

Circus of Pain
 Michael Antener (as STR) – sampler, bass guitar
 G.No – bass guitar
 Ane Hebeisen (as Ane H.) – lead vocals, bass guitar

Additional performers
 Matteo Dainese – drums
 Maurizio Fasolo – sampler, mixing, remixer (3, 6), cover art, design
 Paolo Favati – sampler, remixer (1, 4)
 Mauro Teho Teardo – guitar, bass guitar, sampler, engineering, remixer (2), cover art, design

Production and design
 Zalman Fishman – executive-production

Release history

References

External links 
 

1994 debut EPs
Remix EPs
Meathead (band) albums
Swamp Terrorists albums
Fifth Colvmn Records EPs